Michael Jerome Tuite (December 27, 1966 – December 6, 2003) was an American professional wrestler. He was best known for his appearances with World Championship Wrestling from 1999 to 2001 under the ring names The Wall and Sgt. A.W.O.L., as well as his appearances with Total Nonstop Action Wrestling in 2002 and 2003 as Malice.

Professional wrestling career

Early career (1994–1999)
Born in the Ocean Grove section of Neptune Township, New Jersey to Nancy and Jerome Tuite he had a sister Barbara Tuite-Hacht, Tuite attended Manalapan High School and broke into the wrestling business in 1994 after learning the ropes under veteran Larry Sharpe at his training school in New Jersey. Tuite trained at the WCW Power Plant before he wrestled full-time as The Wall in WCW. He was also a protégé of Bam Bam Bigelow. Tuite debut on March 17, 1996 as Hellraiser defeating Rocky Shore then he appeared in USA Wrestling facing Bodyguard for Hire which he fought in a no contest. He appeared in USA Wrestling again the next week defeating Rocko Dorsey then on November 15, 1996 Hellraiser defeated Gino Caruso. On November 13, 1998, Hellraiser debut at NWA Wrestling, facing JR Ryder, in a losing effort. Tuite finished up on the independent circuit on December 12, 1998 at the Diamond Dallas Page Benefit Show, defeating JL Superstar.

Extreme Championship Wrestling (1997-1998)
On July 12, 1997 Hellraiser made his ECW Debut facing Balls Mahoney in a losing effort. On April 4, 1998 Hellraiser made his debut at NWA New Jersey facing 911, in a no contest. On April 25, 1998 Hellraiser faced 911 again in a losing effort. On October 9, 1998 at ECW, Hellraiser teamed with Tommy Rogers, in a winning effort against The Full Blooded Italians (Little Guido and Big Guido).

World Championship Wrestling

The Wall (1999–2000)
Tuite debuted in World Championship Wrestling in 1999 as a bodyguard for Berlyn, then later moved to the singles division. The Wall and Berlyn had a feud with Vampiro and Jerry Only of the Misfits. The feud led to WCW Mayhem where Berlyn and Vampiro fought in a chain match, which Berlyn lost after The Wall walked out.

The Wall vanished for a while until returning to Souled Out where he defeated Billy Kidman in a cage match. For a while The Wall had an ongoing feud with Kidman and Vampiro. The Wall took on The Demon at SuperBrawl where The Wall beat The Demon. The Wall then feuded with Bam Bam Bigelow, who was angry after The Wall developed a sadistic streak and attacked younger wrestlers, including David Flair and Crowbar. This led to Uncensored where Wall and Bigelow fought in a match where The Wall put Bigelow through a table. Crowbar and Flair tried to get revenge on The Wall, but he gave Crowbar a chokeslam off a 20-foot-high platform, sending Crowbar through the stage.

In April 2000, Eric Bischoff and Vince Russo restarted WCW and vacated all of the titles. The Wall entered the WCW United States Championship tournament, and at Spring Stampede he faced Scott Steiner. He lost, however, when he accidentally chokeslamed a referee through a table and another referee came and disqualified The Wall. He entered into a short feud with Shane Douglas that led to a tables match between them at The Great American Bash, which Douglas won.

Misfits in Action (2000–2001)

The Wall then disappeared again for a while until returning with a new look. Joining the stable The Misfits in Action, a military group that was led by General Hugh G. Rection, Lieutenant Loco, Corporal Cajun, Major Stash and Major Gunns, he was renamed Sgt. A.W.O.L. (occasionally spelled "Sgt. A-Wall"). The group had various stable feuds with 3 Count, The Natural Born Thrillers and Team Canada.

At the start of 2001 The MIA had issues involving Gen. Rection and Lt. Loco, and they led the group to break up. Then Sgt. A.W.O.L. went back to his old character The Wall. The Wall and Hugh Morrus then had a short feud which led into SuperBrawl Revenge where Morrus defeated The Wall. After the feud with Morrus, The Wall appeared sporadically in WCW, and wasn't involved in the final episode of Nitro.

World Wrestling Federation (2001)
After WCW was bought out by Vince McMahon, Tuite signed a developmental contract with the World Wrestling Federation in March 2001. He was later given his release so he could deal with personal issues.

Independent Circuit (2001–2003)
After being released from the WWF, Tuite would reprise his role as The Wall on the independent circuit. On July 12, 2001, The Wall returned at NWA New Jersey defeating Simon Diamond to win the NWA New Jersey Hardcore Championship. Then on August 9, 2001 The Wall faced Danny Doring, in a winning effort to retain the Hardcore Title. On August 24, 2001 The Wall defeated Nova, to retain the Hardcore Championship. Over the next two days, The Wall retained the championship by facing Crowbar, in a TLC match to retain the title. On January 26, 2002, The Wall retained the title, facing Crowbar in a winning effort in a ladder match. On April 5, 2002, The Wall made his debut for Phoenix Championship Wrestling, defeating Gangrel. The next day, The Wall appeared on WWF Jakked, in a dark match facing D-Von Dudley, in a losing effort.
On May 17, 2002, The Wall defeated Harley Lewis in a TLC match for the PCW Championship. The next day at NWA Jersey, The Wall lost a triple threat match against Danny Doring and JL Superstar, for the NWA Championship. On June 8, 2002 at USPW at the Big Dick Dudley Memorial, The Wall Defeated Norman Smiley. On June 15, 2002 at MLW, The Wall faced Taiyo Kea in a losing effort. On August 17, 2002 at USA Pro, The Wall defeated Chris Chetti. On October 5, 2002 at XPW Show (wrestling as SNUFF) he was defeated by Chris Chetti. On November 3, 2002, The Wall defeated Devon Storm in an Anything Goes match to retain the PCW Championship. On November 9, 2002 at NEW Malice defeated Tiger Khan, the next day Malice defeated Norman Smiley, Kevin Northcutt and Joe Kane to win the AWW Championship. On November 16, 2002 at Xtreme Pro Wrestling, Malice defeated Chris Hamrick. On November 22, 2002 at USPW 8th Anniversary Show, The Wall defeated Devon Storm. On December 21, 2002 at All Access Wrestling, Malice defeated Jim Duggan. The next week at National Wrestling Superstars, Malice faced Simon Diamond in a losing effort. On January 17, 2003 at Xtreme Pro Wrestling, Malice faced Super Crazy in a losing effort. The next day, Malice defeated Devon Storm. Then on his final match on the independent circuit on April 19, 2003, Malice faced AJ Styles at All Access Wrestling, in a No Disqualification match for the AWW Heavyweight Title, in a losing effort.

Total Nonstop Action Wrestling (2002–2003)
In 2002, Tuite began wrestling in Total Nonstop Action Wrestling (TNA), performing under the moniker of Malice in 2002. He appeared on the first TNA show, competing in a Gauntlet for the Gold match, lasting to the end until he was defeated by Ken Shamrock. He was a member of James Mitchell's Disciples of the New Church and on numerous occasions nearly won the NWA World's Heavyweight Championship. His last TNA appearance was on November 20, 2002 when he beat Kory Williams. He came back on March 19, 2003, to help Slash and Brian Lee to combat Triple X in an even 3 on 3 battle. However, Slash and Lee were disqualified.

Tuite began wrestling on the independent circuit after leaving TNA, appearing for promotions such as XPW as Snuff, and also held the NWA New Jersey Hardcore Championship. He also won the AAW Heavyweight Championship Tournament in November 2002.

All Japan Pro Wrestling (2003)
In February 2003, Tuite wrestled for All Japan Pro Wrestling as Gigantes, and was a member of Taka Michinoku's Roughly Obsess & Destroy stable. Gigantes made his debut on February 10, teaming with Arashi and The Gladiator against Keiji Mutoh, Masanobu Fuchi, and Jimmy Wang Yang in a winning effort. On February 16, Gigantes teamed with John Tenta to challenge Arashi and Nobutaka Araya for the All Asia Tag Team Championship but lost by disqualification. In March, Gigantes entered the Champion Carnival defeating Yoji Anjo in the first round on March 22 but lost in the second round to eventual winner Satoshi Kojima on March 25. On June 8, Gigantes teamed with The Gladiator in a four-man tournament for the vacant World Tag Team Championship but lost in the semifinals against eventual winners Keiji Mutoh and Arashi. On July 19, Gigantes would have one of the biggest matches of his career as he lost to The Great Muta at the Nippon Budokan. On September 6, Gigantes teamed with Taka to challenge Arashi and Mutoh for the World Tag Team Championship but came up short. From November to December, he teamed with Buchanan in the 2003 World's Strongest Tag Determination League but finished in 6th place with 6 points. In his final match on December 5, 2003 Tuite teamed with Buchanan and Justin Credible to defeat Nobutaka Araya, Tomoaki Honma and Kazushi Miyamoto in Tokyo.

Death
On December 6, 2003, Tuite was found unconscious in his hotel room by All Japan Pro Wrestling management and several wrestlers, including NOSAWA and La Parka. He was taken to a hospital where he was pronounced dead on arrival. The cause of death was later identified as a heart attack by the medical examiner assigned to the case. There is no physical, toxicological or other evidence that illicit substances were an immediate or remote cause of death.

Championships and accomplishments
All Access Wrestling
AAW Heavyweight Championship (1 time)
NWA New Jersey
NWA New Jersey Hardcore Championship (1 time)
New Jack City Wrestling
NJCW Heavyweight Championship (1 time)
Phoenix Championship Wrestling
PCW Heavyweight Championship (1 time)
Pro Wrestling Illustrated
PWI ranked him #126 of the 500 singles wrestlers in the PWI 500 in 2000

See also
 List of premature professional wrestling deaths

References

External links

1966 births
2003 deaths
American male professional wrestlers
Faux German professional wrestlers
Manalapan High School alumni
People from Neptune Township, New Jersey
Professional wrestlers from New Jersey
Sportspeople from Monmouth County, New Jersey
20th-century professional wrestlers
21st-century professional wrestlers